Tanjung Bin Power Station is a large coal-fired power station in Malaysia.

See also 

 List of coal power stations

References 

Coal-fired power stations in Malaysia